The Penn Genome Frontiers Institute, previously known as the Penn Genomics Institute, was established in January 2001 to provide a focus for all aspects of and participants in the genomics community at University of Pennsylvania, Children's Hospital of Philadelphia (CHOP) and the Wistar Institute.

References

External links

2001 establishments in Pennsylvania
Genetics or genomics research institutions
University of Pennsylvania